Browneopsis macrofoliolata is a species of plant in the family Fabaceae. It is found only in Ecuador. Its natural habitat is subtropical or tropical moist montane forests.

References

Detarioideae
Flora of Ecuador
Critically endangered plants
Taxonomy articles created by Polbot